Calliostoma tosaense is a species of sea snail, a marine gastropod mollusk in the family Calliostomatidae.

Some authors place this taxon in the subgenus Calliostoma (Benthastelena).

Description
The size of the shell varies between 12 mm and 25 mm.

Distribution
This marine species occurs off the Philippines, Japan, New Caledonia, the Loyalty Islands and the Kermadec Islands.

References

 Marshall, B.A. (1995). Calliostomatidae (Gastropoda: Trochoidea) from New Caledonia, the Loyalty Islands and the northern Lord Howe Rise. pp. 381–458 in Bouchet, P. (ed.). Résultats des Campagnes MUSORSTOM, Vol. 14 . Mém. Mus. nat. Hist. nat. 167 : 381–458

External links
 

tosaense
Gastropods described in 1961